Blaze of Silver is a 2007 young adult historical novel by K M Grant and the final book in the De Granville Trilogy. The book was released on April 3, 2007 by Puffin Books in the UK and Walker Children's in the US.

Plot summary 
The book takes place shortly after the events in Green Jasper and follows Will, Ellie, Kamil, and Hosanna as they try to deliver the ransom for King Richard. This proves to be difficult, as the leader of the Assassins is seeking revenge against Kamil and is willing to organise a huge betrayal to do so.

Reception
Critical reception for the book was mixed. Booklist wrote that the book's portrayal of horses was one of its highlights, but that "the author's shifting focus makes it hard to decide just who the protagonist is". The School Library Journal also gave a mostly positive review, stating that the book was "satisfying, though perhaps somewhat contrived".

References

2007 British novels
British young adult novels
Children's historical novels
British historical novels
Novels set during the Crusades
Novels about horses
Children's novels about animals
2007 children's books
Puffin Books books